Upper Summit Lake is a lake in Cariboo Land District, in the Central Interior of British Columbia, Canada, about  north of the city of Prince George and  south of the community of Bear Lake. It lies just west of Highway 97 (John Hart Highway).

Hydrology
There are no inflows, and an unnamed creek flows from the southern tip of the lake to Summit Lake. This flows via the Crooked River, McLeod River, Pack River, Williston Lake, Peace River, Slave River, Great Slave Lake and the Mackenzie River into the Beaufort Sea portion of the Arctic Ocean.

References

Lakes of British Columbia
Cariboo Land District